Nala Damayanthi may refer to:
 Nala and Damayanti, characters from the Mahabharatha
 Nala Damayanthi (1959 film), a Tamil film directed by Kemparaj
 Nala Damayanthi (2003 film), a Tamil film directed by Mouli